Warf or WARF may refer to:

 WARF, a radio station (1350 AM) licensed to Akron, Ohio, United States
 Wisconsin Alumni Research Foundation, technology transfer office of the University of Wisconsin–Madison, United States
 Benjamin Warf, American pediatric neurosurgeon and professor
 Warf or Terp, an artificial dwelling mound
 Warf Hall, a coed residence hall of Tennessee Technological University

See also
Wharf (disambiguation)
Worf (disambiguation)